The Beijing Derbies (simplified Chinese: 北京德比; pinyin: Běijīng Débǐ) are various local derbies between the football teams of Beijing. The term specifically refers to individual matches between the teams, but can also be used to describe the general rivalry between the different clubs.

Clubs 
As of 2023 season, there are three clubs in the Chinese Super League, China League One and China League Two that play in Beijing:
 Beijing Guoan F.C. (Super League)
 Beijing Sport University F.C. (League One)
 Beijing Institute of Technology F.C. (League Two) 
Former Football Clubs based in beijing in the first two highest league include Beijing Kuanli F.C.. Liaoning F.C. formerly played in Olympic Sports Centre (Beijing)  for 20 months in 2002–2003. Beijing Renhe F.C. (predecessor of Inter Shanghai/Shaanxi Baorong/Guizhou Renhe) formerly played in Beijing Fengtai Stadium in 2016–2020.

Result

See also 
 Football in Beijing

References

China football rivalries
Football in Beijing
Beijing Guoan F.C.
Beijing Renhe F.C.
Beijing Sport University F.C.